St Chad's, Haggerston, located on Dunloe Street in the Borough of Hackney, is an urban Anglican parish church in the diocese of London, England. Built to designs by architect James Brooks and completed in 1869 as part of the Haggerston Church Scheme, the Grade I Listed church was united with the parish of St Mary, Haggerston in 1953, following the destruction of that church in an air raid in 1941.  St Chad's has a historical association with High Church liturgy and Anglo-Catholicism.

History
In 1862, the Shoreditch and Haggerston Church Extension Fund was started. The district of St Chad was created in 1863, with a committee formed for the erection of the church for the new parish holding its first meeting in January 1864. Construction was begun in 1867, and St Chad's was consecrated on April 4, 1869. At its  design and completion,  St Chad's was situated on the north-east corner of Nichols Square, a poor residential area consisting principally of terraced housing. Brooks also designed and built the adjacent vicarage, circa 1870, which is Grade II* listed.

Nichols Square was demolished in 1963 to create the Fellows Court Estate. In 1970, the church of St Augustine's, Yorkton Street (also built as part of the Haggerston Church Scheme), closed and its parish, which had sustained bombing in the war and subsequent demolition, was incorporated into the parish of St Chad's.

Architecture

Interior
Brooks designed the furniture and liturgical furnishings of several of his landmark East London churches. At St Chad's, he designed the reredos, which was carved by Thomas Earp, and the pulpit, and may have been responsible for further details including the rood screen. The clerestory and rose windows are plainly glazed, but there are several stained glass windows by eminent English designers and manufacturers Clayton and Bell, who were responsible for the three large-scale single figures in the apse – depicting a Christ in Majesty, flanked by windows with Mary as the Blessed Virgin, and St Chad, the church's patron saint.

Present day
St Chad's is an active Anglican parish church under the alternative episcopal oversight of the Bishop of Fulham, and is in the deanery of Hackney, in the Diocese of London. The building is on Historic England's 'Heritage at Risk Register', a programme for identifying for safeguarding significant historical sites at risk of loss.

Further reading
 Bumpus, Thomas Francis (1908). "St Columba's and St Chad's". London Churches Ancient & Modern: Classical & modern. United Kingdom: T. Werner Laurie.
 Betjeman, John; Kerr, Nigel (editor). "Shoreditch: St Chad". Sir John Betjeman's Guide to English Parish Churches (1993), page 370. From the Collins Guide to English Parish Churches (1968). United Kingdom: Harper Collins.

References

External links
Official website
Church of St Chad, Dunloe Street entry on The National Heritage List for England

Grade I listed churches in London
Grade I listed buildings in the London Borough of Hackney
Churches completed in 1869
Church of England church buildings in the London Borough of Hackney
Diocese of London
Victorian architecture in England
19th-century Church of England church buildings
Commissioners' church buildings